The Golden Sword (subtitled Torero Impressions in Jazz) is an album by the Gerald Wilson Orchestra recorded in 1966 and released on the Pacific Jazz label.

Music
The ten tracks "pay tribute to aspects of Mexico". "Carlos" is a tribute to bullfighter Carlos Arruza.

Release and reception

The Golden Sword was released by Pacific Jazz Records. AllMusic rated the album with 4½ stars; in his review, Scott Yanow called it "One of Gerald Wilson's most memorable albums". An All About Jazz reviewer described it as "one of the best Wilson albums of the entire Pacific Jazz lot".

Track listing 
All compositions by Gerald Wilson except as indicated
 "The Golden Sword" - 3:11
 "Man of La Mancha" (Joe Darion, Mitch Leigh) - 2:16
 "The Breeze and I" (Ernesto Lecuona) - 5:23
 "Carlos" - 5:23
 "Chanson du Feu Follet (Song of Mad Fire)" (Manuel de Falla) - 4:07
 "Mi Corazon (My Heart)" - 2:58
 "Blues Latinese" - 5:35
 "The Feather (From "Teatihuacan Suite")" - 4:15
 "La Mentira (The Lie)" (Álvaro Carrillo) - 2:05
 "The Serpent (From "Teatihuacan Suite")" - 4:05 
Recorded at TTG Sound Studios in Hollywood, CA on June 21, 1966 (tracks 4, 8 & 10) July 8, 1966 (tracks 1, 5 & 7) and August 19, 1966 (tracks 2, 3, 6, 8 & 9).

Personnel 
Gerald Wilson - arranger, conductor, maracas
Conte Candoli (tracks 3, 6, 8 & 9), Jules Chaikin, Freddie Hill, Nat Meeks (tracks 1, 5 & 7), Mel Moore, Jimmy Owens (tracks 4, 8 & 10), Al Porcino - trumpet
Mike Barone, John Ewing, Lester Robertson - trombone
Ernie Tack - bass trombone
William Green - flute, piccolo
Jimmy Woods - soprano saxophone, alto saxophone (tracks 1, 4, 5, 7, 8 & 10)
Anthony Ortega - alto saxophone, flute
Teddy Edwards, Harold Land - tenor saxophone
Jack Nimitz - baritone saxophone
Roy Ayers (tracks 1, 4, 5, 7, 8 & 10), Victor Feldman (tracks 2, 3, 6, 8 & 9) - vibraphone
Jack Wilson - piano
Laurindo Almeida - guitar (tracks 2, 3, 6, 8 & 9) 
Buddy Woodson - double bass
Mel Lee - drums
Max Garduno congas

References 

Gerald Wilson albums
1966 albums
Pacific Jazz Records albums
Albums arranged by Gerald Wilson
Albums conducted by Gerald Wilson